"Back on My Feet Again" is a song by The Babys. It was released in 1979 as a single from their album Union Jacks.

The song is the band's final Top 40 hit, peaking at No. 33 on the Billboard Hot 100.

Chart performance

References

1980 singles
1980 songs
Songs written by John Waite
Songs written by Frank Musker
Song recordings produced by Keith Olsen
The Babys songs
Chrysalis Records singles
Songs written by Dominic Bugatti